The 2003–04 Ukrainian Second League was the 13th season of 3rd level professional football in Ukraine.

The competitions were divided into three groups according to geographical location in the country – A is western Ukraine, B is southern Ukraine and Crimea, and C is eastern Ukraine.

Team changes

Promoted
The following team was promoted from the 2003 Ukrainian Football Amateur League:
 FC Cherkasy – (returning after an absence of a seasons)
 FC Hazovyk-KhGV Kharkiv – (debut)
 FC Helios Kharkiv – (debut)
 FC Ikva Mlyniv – (debut, admitted in place of FC Kovel-Volyn-2)
 FC Krymteplytsia Molodizhne – (debut)
 FC Rava Rava-Ruska – (debut)
 FC Vodnyk Mykolaiv – (debut)

Also, three more clubs were admitted additionally:
 FC Arsenal-2 Kyiv – (debut)
 FC Kryvbas-2 Kryvyi Rih – (returning after an absence of a seasons)
 FC Palmira Odesa – (debut)

Relegated
Only one team was relegated from the 2002–03 Ukrainian First League.
 FC Sokil Zolochiv – 18th place (returning after a season)

Renamed / reorganized
 FC Karpaty-3 Lviv changed its name to FC Halychyna-Karpaty Lviv.
 FC LUKOR Kalush (last year winner) changed its name to FC Prykarpattia Kalush after merging with FC Prykarpattia Ivano-Frankivsk. 
The second half of the season it changed to FC Spartak-2 Ivano-Frankivsk.
 FC Dynamo Simferopol changed its name to FC Dynamo-Ihroservice Simferopol.
 FC Avanhard Rovenky changed its name to FC Avanhard-Inter Rovenky.
 FC Avanhard Rovenky at first merged with FC Inter Luhansk, later with FC Molniya Severodonetsk continuing to play as Avanhard-Inter.

Withdrawn

Before
 FC Sokil Zolochiv, recently relegated from the 2002–03 Ukrainian First League it withdrew before the season 
 FC Shakhtar Luhansk, a last season group runner-up, it folded before the season
 FC Systema-KKhP Chernyakhiv, a single season team, it withdrew before the season
 FC Kovel-Volyn-2 failed to obtain license for the season

During
 FC Vodnyk Mykolaiv, withdrew at mid-season
 FC Elektron Romny, withdrew just before the end of the season
 FC Arsenal-2 Kyiv, withdrew just before the end of the season

After
 FC Avanhard Rovenky, replaced with FC Molniya Severodonetsk at the end of the season
 FC Podillya Khmelnytskyi, merged with FC Krasyliv-Obolon as FC Podillya Khmelnytskyi
 FC Borysfen-2 Boryspil
 FC Karpaty-Halychyna Lviv
 FC Chornomorets-2 Odesa, transitioned into reserve championship
 FC Kryvbas-2 Kryvyi Rih, transitioned into reserve championship
 FC Dnipro-2 Dnipropetrovsk, transitioned into reserve championship
 FC Metalurh-2 Donetsk, transitioned into reserve championship

Changed groups
 Borysfen-2 Boryspil from Group B to A
 Obolon-2 Kyiv from Group B to A
 Metalurh-2 Zaporizhzhia from Group B to C

Group A

Location map

Final standings

Top goalscorers

Group B

Location map

Final standings

Top goalscorers

Group C

Location map

Final standings

Top goalscorers

See also
 2003–04 Ukrainian Premier League
 2003–04 Ukrainian First League
 2003–04 Ukrainian Cup

References

External links
 2003-04 season by Oleksiy Kobyzev.

Ukrainian Second League seasons
3
Ukra